Lyonetia myricella is a moth in the family Lyonetiidae. It is known from Japan (Kyushu, Yakushima).

The wingspan is about 7-7.5 mm. Adults are on wing in November.

The larvae feed on Myrica rubra. They mine the leaves of their host plant. The mine has the form of a linear-blotch mine. The linear portion is brown, while the blotch portion is whitish to whitish-green and semitransparent. The earliest linear mine reaches the midrib and extends towards the apex of the leaf through the midrib. Later, the larva mines from the midrib into the mesophyll near the apex of the leaf in an irregular blotch. The blackish frass is scattered in the blotch mine.

External links
Revisional Studies On The Family Lyonetiidae Of Japan (Lepidoptera)

Lyonetiidae
Moths of Japan